"Surrender Your Love" is a song recorded by British house music group Nightcrawlers, released in May 1995 as the second single from their only album, Lets Push It (1995). Produced by American DJ and record producer MK, the song is co-written by him with John Reid and was released shortly after the previous single, "Push the Feeling On" (in France, it entered the top-50 only three weeks after "Push the Feeling On"). It became a hit in various countries, such as the UK, Finland, France and the Netherlands, where it reached the top 10. On the Eurochart Hot 100, it peaked at number 19 in June 1995. Outside Europe, the song was successful in Israel, peaking at number eight.

Composition
"Surrender Your Love" is very similar in sound to "Push the Feeling On" (structure, house music sonorities, vocals), and sees singer Reid returning to a more traditional verse-chorus construction. The chorus is made out of editing syllables from the actual verses, and goes like "(Sa)-ying We Have Got/Feeling/..ying We Have/Wanna Stay". This is the typical remixing style of MK.

Critical reception
John Bush from AllMusic described "Surrender Your Love" as a deep-house hit. In his weekly UK chart commentary, James Masterton wrote, "The new single has more of a song structure than the last hit, owing to the presence of vocalist John Reid on the track. Another Top 3 hit could well be on the cards." Pan-European magazine Music & Media commented, "The beat goes on, but no longer on FFRR. On their Arista label debut, the inventors of the "canned vibraphone" effect as further perfected by Robin S. push the feeling a little further on." 

A reviewer from Music Week gave the track three out of five, adding that it "retains the familiar elements of its predecessor though this is a less striking re-invention." Brad Beatnik from the RM Dance Update gave it four out of five, writing, "Just when we've worked out the lyrics for the last hit, along comes another brainteaser. This is very much in the same mould with MK on hand again to cut up the vocal and add the inimitably simple keyboard stabs and rumbling organ and bass. This one-sided promo is equally catchy and there's no reason why it shouldn't go the same way as "Push the Feeling On"." Another editor, James Hamilton, noted the "more coherently whined than "Push the Feeling On" but similarly nagged, honked and burbled striding 122.5bpm MK Club and Dub Mixes, co-created right from scratch by Marc Kinchen this time".

Music video
A music video was produced to promote the single. It was later published by Vevo on YouTube on September 1, 2014, and had generated more than 1.8 million views as of January 2023.

Track listings
 CD single
 "Surrender Your Love" (MK radio edit) — 3:51
 "Surrender Your Love" (MK dub mix) — 6:06

 CD maxi
 "Surrender Your Love" (MK radio edit) — 3:48
 "Surrender Your Love" (MK club mix) — 8:24
 "Surrender Your Love" (Wand's Crunchy nut mix) — 8:52
 "Surrender Your Love" (MK dub mix) — 6:04
 "Surrender Your Love" (Wand's Sugar puff mix) — 4:17

Charts

Weekly charts

Year-end charts

References

1995 singles
1996 singles
1995 songs
Nightcrawlers (band) songs
Songs written by Marc Kinchen